Mount Niobe is a  summit located in the Tantalus Range, in Tantalus Provincial Park, in southwestern British Columbia, Canada. Lake Lovely Water lies below the northern slope of the peak and precipitation runoff from the peak drains into tributaries of the Squamish River. The first ascent of the mountain was made in 1910 by E. Kingsford-Smith and G. Warren via the south side. The mountain's name was officially adopted on June 6, 1957, by the Geographical Names Board of Canada. The mountain was named for Niobe, daughter of Tantalus in Greek mythology, with several peaks in the Tantalus Range being named for family members of Tantalus.

Climate

Based on the Köppen climate classification, Mount Niobe is located in the marine west coast climate zone of western North America. Most weather fronts originate in the Pacific Ocean, and travel east toward the Coast Mountains where they are forced upward by the range (Orographic lift), causing them to drop their moisture in the form of rain or snowfall. As a result, the Coast Mountains experience high precipitation, especially during the winter months in the form of snowfall. Temperatures can drop below −20 °C with wind chill factors below −30 °C. This climate supports small glacier remnants  on the east and north slopes of Niobe. The months July through September offer the most favorable weather for climbing Niobe.

Climbing Routes
Established rock climbing routes on Mount Niobe:

 South Side -  First ascent 1910
 Northeast Ridge -  FA 1960 
 North Rib -  FA 1963  
 West Side -

See also

 Geography of British Columbia
 Geology of British Columbia
 Mount Pelops

References

External links
 Weather: Mount Niobe

Niobe
Pacific Ranges
Sea-to-Sky Corridor
New Westminster Land District